Liu Chi On (born 26 January 1959) is a Hong Kong fencer. He competed in the team foil and the individual and team épée events at the 1984 Summer Olympics.

References

1959 births
Living people
Hong Kong female foil fencers
Hong Kong female épée fencers
Olympic fencers of Hong Kong
Fencers at the 1984 Summer Olympics
Fencers at the 1986 Asian Games
Asian Games competitors for Hong Kong